was a village located in Kiso District, Nagano Prefecture, Japan.

As of 2003, the village had an estimated population of 2,026 and a density of 13.55 persons per km². The total area was 149.54 km².

On November 1, 2005, Kaida, along with the town of Kisofukushima, and the villages of Hiyoshi and Mitake (all from Kiso District), was merged to create the town of Kiso.

Dissolved municipalities of Nagano Prefecture
Kiso, Nagano (town)